Kalab may refer to:
 Kalab, Gilan
 Kalab-e Ahmad, Kohgiluyeh and Boyer-Ahmad Province
 Kalab-e Olya, Kohgiluyeh and Boyer-Ahmad Province
 Kalab-e Sofla, Kohgiluyeh and Boyer-Ahmad Province
 Kalab-e Vosta, Kohgiluyeh and Boyer-Ahmad Province
 Kalab, North Khorasan
 Kalab-e Sufian (disambiguation)